The 2006 Vuelta a Castilla y León was the 21st edition of the Vuelta a Castilla y León cycle race and was held on 20 March to 24 March 2006. The race started in Valladolid and finished in Segovia. The race was won by Alexander Vinokourov.

Teams
Fifteen teams of up to eight riders started the race:

 
 
 
 
 
 
 
 3 Molinos Resort
 
 Kaiku

General classification

References

Vuelta a Castilla y León
Vuelta a Castilla y León by year
2006 in Spanish sport